Bugeat is a commune in the Corrèze department in central France in the Nouvelle-Aquitaine region. Its inhabitants are called les Bugeacois and les Bugeacoises.

Geography
Commune located in the Massif Central and the parc naturel régional de Millevaches en Limousin. It is watered by the river Vézère and two of its tributaries, the Ars and the Ruisseau des Rochers.

Population

History

Antiquity
Before the conquest of Gaul by the Romans, the human presence at Bugeat was signified by mounds, called tumuli, such as the mound erected in the wood of Chaleix. These tumuli are burial sites, most often linked to the Gallic civilisation of La  Tène (period 450 to 50 BC). These burials are frequently located on summits, and have a circular shape of several metres in diameter and 1 metre in height. In the 1st century AD, the Gallo-Roman civilisation developed, whose presence at Bugeat is manifested through the Gallo-Roman villa known as the Champ du palais. This construction, that of a farm, left vestiges near the Pont des Rochers, on the Bugeat-Égletons road. Foundation walls, a column fragment, ceramics, and coins were found at this location.

Middle Ages
 Among the monuments dating from the Middle Ages in Bugeat was the church of the parish, a parish under the patronage of Saint-Doux. A church existed in the 12th century, in Romanesque style, in the form of a cross. This Romanesque church no longer exists and all that remains from that time is a Romanesque baptismal vessel, adorned with curved arches, surmounted by a row of small circles. This ancient church was replaced, between the 14th and 15th century's, by the present church, in Gothic style. The building has on its entrance facade, a steeple-wall and inside, several bays with bossed keystones vaults with sculptures of a crown, a rose and a rhombus.

1789 to 1914
In the last quarter of 19th century, Bugeat experienced an important event, the arrival of the railway. On 8 October 1883, the section from Eymoutiers-Meymac, belonging to the Limoges-Ussel railway line, was inaugurated. The station at Bugeat resulted in the appearance of the town on the railway maps.

The Great War (1914-1918)
The First World War, as was the case for all the French communes, affected the history of the commune of Bugeat in a profound and lasting way. The human balance of the conflict is terrible: 74 soldiers from the commune of Bugeat died, and in Bugeat in 1919, 60 disabled men were recorded. The effect of the conflict on the demography is notable: between 1911 and 1921, the population of Bugeat declined by 5 per cent, while the population of the canton of Bugeat declined by more than 18 per cent (war, but also the rural exodus, which began before 1914, explains this setback).

The vast majority of Bugeat's soldiers were enrolled in Infantry Regiments (RI), such as the 100th RI, the 126th RI, the 300th RI. These regiments belong to the 24th Infantry Division, which was part of the 12th Corps, which was the Army Corps of the military region based in Limoges from the departments of the Charente, the Corrèze, the Dordogne and the Haute-Vienne.

Many of the 74 soldiers who died during this period were the victims of the battles in the Marne, as well as the battles of the  l'Aisne and the battles of the Somme. Other soldiers were killed outside of France, such as the soldier engaged on the Eastern front, in Serbia, Marius Jean-Baptiste Manigne, who died on 11 March 1917 in Leskovets (the village of Leskoets – current spelling – is today in Macedonia).

The Inter-war period (1918-1939)
In 1923, the supply of running water was carried out in the village of Bugeat. At that time, the connection to "running water" was made for some individuals in the village. Up until the installation, hydrants were judiciously placed to serve the different districts of the town.

Second World War (1939-1945)
On 6 April 1944, a German army company departing to the Normandy front shot four Jews in Tarnac, and four inhabitants of the village were shot by German soldiers to terrorise the people who protected resistance fighters from Êchameil.

On 29 April 1944, three resistance fighters were tortured and then shot in Vergne by German soldiers for refusing to reveal where their camp was located.

On 5 May 1944, the German Army unit attacked the groupe Lalet based in the abandoned village of Bordes de Bonnefond, which they burned. Among the resistance fighters, two were killed in battle — Lucien Niarfeix and Charles Terracol — three were deported to Dachau, René Dumas, who had been wounded during the attack, Louis Brousse and Roger Lavieille, the latter not returning from death camp.

On 14 July 1944, during a clash with the brigade Jesser, three resistance fighters (Henri Cayet, Pierre Orluc, Auguste Stein) of the 238e compagnie FTPF died in Marcy and six members were deported. Before leaving, the Nazis set fire to the village.

On the night of 11 August 1944, the French soldiers of the 3rd SAS Parachute Regiment arrived at Fonfreyde to fight against the German Army, alongside their comrades from the Maquis.

Deported from Gourdon-Murat
A stele was erected in memory of three resistance members deported from the commune of Gourdon-Murat. One was arrested in Paris by the Special brigades of Pétain and deported to Ravensbrück, another was deported to Buchenwald in the same circumstances, and one who was to be hanged, finally deported to Dachau.

End of 1940s to the present day
Initiatives were taken by leaders, at various levels, and from various backgrounds, to try to develop the commune economically. As tourism appears to be one of the only opportunities for the development of Bugeat, the initiatives undertaken are aimed at the different types of tourism: family Tourism (example: "Secondary residence"), social tourism, sports tourism (see below), outdoor tourism (example: hiking). A great success was made in the area of sports tourism. This involved the setting up of a National Training Centre at Bugeat. Following Alain Mimoun's victory at the Melbourne Marathon in 1956, he worked to set up a training centre in Bugeat, where he and his wife owned a second home and where he had prepared for the 1956 Melbourne Olympics. From 1967, municipal, departmental, regional and national policymakers made decisions leading to the construction of a gymnasium, near the Ganette Stadium, then constructing accommodation for athletes. This is how the national training centre of Bugeat developed, now known as the Espace Mille Sources.

See also
Communes of the Corrèze department

References

Communes of Corrèze
Corrèze communes articles needing translation from French Wikipedia